Terry Lamey (born 7 January 1977) is an Australian former professional rugby league footballer who played in the late 1990s.

Playing career
Lamey played for the Illawarra Steelers for two seasons between 1997 and 1998, St. George Illawarra Dragons for two seasons between 1999-2000 and one season at South Sydney in 2002.

Lamey played in Illawarra's final ever game in the top grade which was against Canterbury-Bankstown in Round 24 1998 which ended in a 25–24 loss at WIN Stadium.  Lamey made only 1 appearance for St George in 1999 and did not play in the club's 1999 grand final defeat.  In 2002, Lamey joined South Sydney who had just been re-admitted to the competition.  Lamey only played 2 games for Souths and retired at the end of the 2002 season.

References

1977 births
Living people
Australian rugby league players
St. George Illawarra Dragons players
Illawarra Steelers players
South Sydney Rabbitohs players
Rugby league second-rows
Rugby league players from Port Kembla, New South Wales